"Why Can't I?" is a song by American singer-songwriter Liz Phair. It was released on May 5, 2003, as the lead single from her self-titled album, Liz Phair. It reached number 32 on the Billboard Hot 100, Phair's highest-charting single and only top-40 single. The song was certified gold in the US, having sold 500,000 copies there.

Writing and inspiration
"Why Can't I?" was written by Phair and The Matrix. Phair released "Why Can't I?" in hopes that she would expand her audience and attract more listeners to its parent record, Liz Phair (2003). In an interview with Vice, Phair explained: "My hope was that someone would hear the song in the gym and buy the record and then start buying my albums and sort of have an awakening."

Composition
"Why Can't I?" is written in the key of B major and has a tempo of 81 beats per minute.  It follows a chord progression of B–B/A–Gm7–E(add 2).

Critical reception

Chuck Taylor of Billboard called the song a "melodic adult pop/rocker" and a "knock-out, stand-out, break-out record that adult top 40 should take right home." Matt LeMay of Pitchfork said that with the "cookie-cutter rock/pop background" it could easily pass for Michelle Branch." Mary Huhn of the New York Post called the song "a breathless romantic confection, and very un-Phair-like". Mim Udovitch of Slate called the song an "almost parodically basic power ballad" but stated that the chorus is "hooky".

Keith Phipps of The A.V. Club criticized the song, referring to it as "an embarrassingly awkward marriage of dumbed-down Phair songwriting and every tired production trick of the last year". Adrien Begrand of PopMatters compared the song to Avril Lavigne, referring to it as "a note-for-note retread of Lavigne's "Complicated".

Music video
The video was directed by Phil Harder and was released in June 2003. It features a jukebox where an unknown man puts a coin in the jukebox where Liz Phair appears on every record cover on the jukebox indicating the song's lyrics.

Track listing
 CD single
 "Why Can't I?"  – 3:28
 "Jeremy Engle"  – 3:10
 "Fine Again"  – 2:47

Credits and personnel
Credits and personnel are adapted from the Liz Phair album liner notes.
 Liz Phair – writer, lead vocals
 The Matrix – writer, production, arrangement, recording, additional vocals
 Krish Sharma – drum recording
 Serban Ghenea – mixing
 Corky James – guitars
 Victor Indrizzo – drums
 Wizardz of Oz – additional vocals

Charts

Weekly charts

Year-end charts

Certifications and sales

Release history

References

Liz Phair songs
2003 singles
2003 songs
Capitol Records singles
Music videos directed by Phil Harder
Song recordings produced by the Matrix (production team)
Songs written by Graham Edwards (musician)
Songs written by Lauren Christy
Songs written by Liz Phair
Songs written by Scott Spock